Barnier is a surname, and may refer to:

 Michel Barnier (born 1951), conservative French politician
 Romain Barnier (born 1976), French freestyle swimmer

See also

 Barnie
 Bernier

French-language surnames